Anastasia Oberstolz-Antonova (born 12 October 1981) is a Soviet/Russian-born, Italian luger who has competed since the late 1990s and for Italy since 2003. She won two bronze medals in the mixed team event at the FIL World Luge Championships (2004, 2005).

At the FIL European Luge Championships, Oberstolz-Antonova earned two silver medals in the mixed team event (2004, 2006).

Oberstolz-Antonova finished 15th in the women's singles event at the 2002 Winter Olympics in Salt Lake City. At the following Winter Olympics, she was involved in a serious crash during the first run of the women's singles event and did not finish as a result.

Oberstolz-Antonova is married to fellow Italian luger Christian Oberstolz. She sat out the 2006-7 World Cup season, giving birth to a daughter, Alexandria, on 14 May 2007.

References
 FIL-Luge news from June 14, 2007 on the growing baby boom among Italian lugers, including Oberstolz-Antonova
 
 Hickok sports information on World champions in luge and skeleton.
 List of European luge champions

External links
 

1981 births
Living people
Italian female lugers
Russian female lugers
Olympic lugers of Italy
Olympic lugers of Russia
Lugers at the 2002 Winter Olympics
Lugers at the 2006 Winter Olympics
Russian emigrants to Italy